Luis Francisco Perez (born August 26, 1994) is an American football quarterback for the Vegas Vipers of the XFL. He played college football at Texas A&M University–Commerce from 2015 to 2017. Prior to that, he played junior college football at Southwestern College in Chula Vista, California. He was awarded the Harlon Hill Trophy in 2017 as the best football player in NCAA Division II and led the Lions to their second National Championship in football during the 2017 season, their first since 1972.

Early years 
Perez was born in San Diego, California to Juan and Carla Perez. His father was a professional soccer player in his native country of Mexico. Perez grew up in the Rancho Del Rey neighborhood of Chula Vista, California and started playing quarterback at a young age in Junior High.

As a child, Perez went bowling with his family. Eventually, he started attending a bowling league every Tuesday at age nine before being entered into tournaments. He soon became a top rated amateur in California, bowling 12 perfect games with the plan to go to a university on a bowling scholarship.

He attended Otay Ranch High School. Perez played sub-varsity football his first two years, in addition to basketball. He was moved to tight end to play in ORHS's Wing T offense, but stopped playing football due to frequently being moved to different positions, never playing varsity football. He graduated from Otay Ranch in 2012.

College career

Southwestern College
Perez walked on at Southwestern College in his hometown of Chula Vista with no high school film and no experience at high school level. He was recommended to switch positions but ignored it, instead opting to start as the 9th of 9 quarterbacks on the depth chart for the Jaguars, but eventually became the starter due to injuries and transfers of other players, earning the 2nd spot on the depth chart during the fall camp of 2013. At the third week of Southwestern's 2013 season, the starter was injured, leading to Perez's debut for the team against Los Angeles Pierce College, throwing for 250 yards, two touchdown passes and one rushing touchdown, leading the team to a win. He played roughly half the season before injuring his leg. He started again the next season and led the Jaguars to a conference title and all conference honors throwing for 280 in 3 or more games and his best game of the season being against San Bernardino, throwing for 299 yards and 3 touchdowns on 31–44 attempts.

Texas A&M–Commerce
After his 2014 season at Southwestern, Perez visited NCAA Division I schools in hope of a scholarship including UC Davis, Oklahoma State and several others because of what he described as "living on that Division I dream." Perez transferred to play for Texas A&M–Commerce, a Division II school in Northeast Texas. He redshirted his first year on campus
during the 2015 season while the Lions won their second straight Lone Star Conference title with fellow Southern California native Harrison Stewart as the starting quarterback. The 2015 Lions qualified for the NCAA Division II playoffs for the first time since 1995.

Perez nabbed the starting quarterback job over fellow redshirt transfer Gabriel Rodriguez in 2016. In doing so, he became the first player of Mexican-American or Hispanic descent to start at quarterback for the Lions. The Lions won 10 regular season games and repeated as Lone Star conference champions. The Lions defeated Colorado Mesa in the first round of the NCAA Division II playoffs, their first win in the Division II playoffs since 1991, before bowing out to the Grand Valley State Lakers in the second round. Perez was first-team All-Conference, a Harlon Hill Award nominee, and Honorable Mention All-American.

In 2017, Perez and the Lions went 10–1 in the regular season and finished second in the Lone Star Conference behind Midwestern State University and qualified for the NCAA Division II playoffs for the third straight year. The Lions defeated Winona State in the first round of the playoffs 20–7 and then knocked off the top ranked team in the region, the Central Washington Wildcats, in a double overtime thriller, 34–31. In the Super Region 4 final, the Lions defeated a heavily favored Minnesota State-Mankato team by a 31–21 score, setting them up to host the National semi-final against the Harding Bison at Memorial Stadium in Commerce. It was the first appearance in the semifinals since the 1980 season when the Lions advanced to the NAIA national semi-finals. The Lions downed the Bison's top ranked rushing attack 31–17 to advance to the National title game. Prior the national title game, Perez was awarded with the Harlon Hill Trophy, as the best football player in Division II. The Lions defeated the West Florida Argonauts in the national title game, giving A&M–Commerce their second national title in school history and their first since joining the NCAA in 1982. Perez once again was first-team All-LSC in addition to being named National Offensive player of the year, Lone Star Conference Offensive Back of the Year, and First-team All-American. He participated in the NFLPA Collegiate Bowl at the Rose Bowl in Pasadena, California for his final college game. In his final season with the Lions, Perez passed for 298.3 yards per game ranking ninth throughout the entire NCAA, one of the only three players in all NCAA divisions with over 5,000 passing yards. Perez had completed 590-of-880 passes and had the Texas A&M-Commerce record of 22–3.

College statistics

CCCAA statistics

NCAA statistics

Awards 
 National champion (2017)
 Harlon Hill Trophy (2017)
 2× First-team All-Lone Star Conference (2016, 2017)
 Don Hansen Honorable Mention All-American (2016) Don Hansen's 2nd Team All-Super Region 4.
 Second-team All-American (2017)
 2× First-team All-American (2016, 2017)
 J.W. Rollins Award as the Lone Star Conference's Offensive Player of the Year
 Associated Press First-team All-American
 Association First-team All-American and Ron Lenz Division II Offensive Player of the Year
 Voted Best Returning Quarterback in DII Football (2016)

Professional career

Los Angeles Rams
Perez was not selected in the 2018 NFL Draft, however he was invited to attend rookie mini-camp for the Los Angeles Rams. He officially signed with the Los Angeles Rams as an undrafted free agent on May 14, 2018. Perez participated in Rams training camp and saw his first pro football action during the Rams' final preseason game on August 30, 2018 at New Orleans. Playing the entire second half, Perez completed 8-of-15 passes for 43 yards with an interception as the host Saints defeated the Rams 28–0. He was waived on September 1, 2018 and was signed to the practice squad the next day. He was released on September 18, 2018.

Birmingham Iron
After being waived by the Rams, Perez signed with the San Antonio Commanders of the new Alliance of American Football. On November 27, he was drafted in the first round, fifth overall by the Birmingham Iron in the AAF's quarterback draft.

In his first game for the Iron on February 10, 2019, against the Memphis Express, Perez threw for 252 yards on 19 of 33 passing, leading the team to a shutout victory of 26–0. He finished the season with 1,460 passing yards, 5 touchdowns and 6 interceptions. Perez led Birmingham to a 5–3 record so Birmingham clinched a playoff berth two weeks before the end of the regular season. However the AAF suspended football operations after the eighth week.

Philadelphia Eagles
After the AAF suspended football operations, Perez signed with the Philadelphia Eagles on April 9, 2019. He was waived by the Eagles on May 13, 2019.

Detroit Lions
On August 27, 2019, Perez was signed by the Detroit Lions, but was waived four days later.

Los Angeles Wildcats
To begin the 2020 XFL Draft, Perez was one of the 8 "tier 1" quarterbacks who were assigned to each team in the league, where Perez was assigned to the Los Angeles Wildcats. He signed a contract with the team on November 4, 2019.
After the Wildcats claimed Josh Johnson in a supplemental draft in November 2019, Perez was traded to the New York Guardians in exchange for quarterback Chad Kanoff on January 19, 2020.

New York Guardians 
He started the season as a second string quarterback behind Matt McGloin. In week 3 he returned onto the field against the St. Louis BattleHawks. He completed 4 out of 5 passes for 39 yards and passed for one touchdown. He was named the Guardians' starting quarterback for week 4, completing 18 of 26 passes for 150 yards and a touchdown in a victory over the Wildcats. In week 5 he started the second time for the New York Guardians in their Game against the Dallas Renegades. He led the Guardians to their second straight win. He completed 16 of 30 passes for 229 yards, one touchdown and one interception.

However the XFL stopped its regular season after 5 weeks due to the COVID-19 pandemic. He had his contract terminated when the league suspended operations on April 10, 2020.

TSL Jousters 
In 2021, Luis Perez was a starting quarterback for the Jousters of The Spring League. He led the Jousters to the league's first and only Mega Bowl.

New Jersey Generals
On April 1, 2022, the New Jersey Generals signed Perez to a contract. Perez had gone undrafted in the 2022 USFL Draft but was signed as a last-minute addition to the Generals roster after Generals presumptive starting quarterback Ben Holmes suffered a toe injury and was cut from the roster. 

On the league’s kickoff game on April 16, 2022, Perez threw the first ever touchdown in USFL history. He would finish the inaugural game with 13 completions on 18 attempts for 143 yards and 2 touchdowns, while also losing a fumble. The Generals would lose this game 28-24. 

Luis Perez would come into a week 6 game vs Gamblers in relief of De'Andre Johnson . He led a game winning walk off touchdown drive with a quarterback sneak with :02 seconds left. The Generals won 26-25.

Los Angeles Rams (second stint)
On July 23, 2022, Perez signed with the Los Angeles Rams. He was released on August 16, 2022.

Vegas Vipers
Perez was selected by the Vegas Vipers in the 2023 XFL Draft. On the opening game of the 2023 season, Perez started for the Vipers, throwing for 249 yards and 2 touchdowns, completing 22 passes out of 36 attempts. Perez also threw two interceptions, resulting in defensive touchdowns as the Vipers lost 20-22 to the Arlington Renegades.

Career statistics

Regular season

Postseason

Personal life
Perez has been married to his wife Brenda since 2015. He graduated from A&M-Commerce on December 14, 2017 along with his wife, the day before winning the National Title.

References

External links

1994 births
Living people
American sportspeople of Mexican descent
Players of American football from San Diego
American football quarterbacks
Junior college football players in the United States
Texas A&M–Commerce Lions football players
Los Angeles Rams players
Birmingham Iron players
San Antonio Commanders players
Philadelphia Eagles players
Detroit Lions players
Los Angeles Wildcats (XFL) players
New York Guardians players
The Spring League players
New Jersey Generals (2022) players
Vegas Vipers players